Arbelodes dicksoni is a moth in the family Cossidae. It is found in South Africa, where it has been recorded from Cape Town. The habitat consists of subtropical thickets.

The length of the forewings is about 10 mm. The forewings are glossy ivory yellow, with ivory yellow spots  at the costal margin and a pure white terminal band. The hindwings are glossy ivory yellow.

Etymology
The species is named for Charles Gordon Campbell Dickson who collected the holotype.

References

Natural History Museum Lepidoptera generic names catalog

Endemic moths of South Africa
Moths described in 2010
Metarbelinae